Padasak Tanviriyavechakul (born 17 May 1995) is a Thai table tennis player.

Padasak started playing table tennis at the age of 8. Padasak participated in the 2010 Summer Youth Olympics and the 2014 Summer Youth Olympics.

References

https://web.archive.org/web/20150608160105/http://www.siamsport.co.th/Column/150604_112.html
https://web.archive.org/web/20160304103306/http://www.thaitabletennis.com/wizContent.asp?wizConID=914

1995 births
Living people
Padasak Tanviriyavechakul
Padasak Tanviriyavechakul
Table tennis players at the 2016 Summer Olympics
Table tennis players at the 2014 Summer Youth Olympics
Table tennis players at the 2014 Asian Games
Table tennis players at the 2018 Asian Games
Padasak Tanviriyavechakul
Southeast Asian Games medalists in table tennis
Padasak Tanviriyavechakul
Padasak Tanviriyavechakul
Competitors at the 2013 Southeast Asian Games
Competitors at the 2015 Southeast Asian Games
Padasak Tanviriyavechakul
Competitors at the 2017 Southeast Asian Games
Competitors at the 2019 Southeast Asian Games
Padasak Tanviriyavechakul
Competitors at the 2021 Southeast Asian Games
Padasak Tanviriyavechakul